Slaba Gorica is a remote abandoned settlement in the Municipality of Črnomelj in the White Carniola area of southeastern Slovenia. The area is part of the traditional region of Lower Carniola and is now included in the Southeast Slovenia Statistical Region. Its territory is now part of the village of Rožič Vrh.

History
Slaba Gorica was a Gottschee German village. In the mid-18th century it had three houses, and in 1931 it had four. The original residents were expelled in the fall of 1941. The village was burned by Italian troops during the Rog Offensive in the summer of 1942 and was never rebuilt.

References

External links
Slaba Gorica on Geopedia
Pre–World War II map of Slaba Gorica with oeconyms and family names

Former populated places in the Municipality of Črnomelj